Victor Giurgiu (born May 16, 1930, in Moieciu, Brașov County) is a Romanian forestry engineer, a titular member of the Romanian Academy since 2009.

References

Titular members of the Romanian Academy
1930 births
Living people
People from Brașov County